Kazuyuki Ishihara (石原和幸 Ishihara Kazuyuki) is a Japanese garden designer who has won many gold medals at the Chelsea Flower Show.  His design for 2019 is an artisan garden, "Green Switch", whose theme is switching from the urban environment to a natural one. It is planted with horsetail, iris, maple, moss, pine, watercress and features two waterfalls and a Japanese tea room.

Biography 
Kazuyuki Ishihara was born in 1958, in Nagasaki Prefecture. When he was 22 he began studying ikenobō-school ikebana.

References

Landscape or garden designers
1958 births
Living people
Japanese designers